John Charles Buckley was a provincial politician from Alberta, Canada. He served as a member of the Legislative Assembly of Alberta from 1921 to 1935 sitting with the United Farmers caucus in government.

Political career
Buckley ran for a seat to the Alberta Legislature in the 1921 Alberta general election as a United Farmers candidate in the electoral district of Gleichen. He defeated Liberal candidate H. Scott with a comfortable majority to pick up the open seat for his party.

Buckley ran for a second term in the 1926 Alberta general election. He increased his popular vote slightly easily winning the three-way race.

The 1930 Alberta general election would see Buckley defend his seat in a hotly contested battle against Independent candidate H.S.B. Chamberlain. He managed to hold his vote share and win his third term in office.

Buckley ran for a fourth term in office in the 1935 Alberta general election and finished a distant second place out of four candidates losing to Social Credit candidate Isaac McCune.

References

External links
Legislative Assembly of Alberta Members Listing

United Farmers of Alberta MLAs
1863 births
1942 deaths